Diaphus sagamiensis is a species of lanternfish found in the Northwest Pacific Ocean.

Etymology
The fish is named after Sagami Bay, Japan.

References

Myctophidae
Taxa named by Charles Henry Gilbert
Fish described in 1913